Kenneth F. Smith is a special effects artist. He works at ILM as well. He also won 2 Academy awards.

Oscars
Both films were in the category of Best Visual Effects

55th Academy Awards-E.T. the Extra-Terrestrial. Award shared with Carlo Rambaldi and Dennis Muren. Won.
60th Academy Awards-Innerspace. Award shared with Bill George, Dennis Muren and Harley Jessup. Won.

Selected filmography

Pirates of the Caribbean: The Curse of the Black Pearl (2003)
Harry Potter and the Chamber of Secrets (2002)
Minority Report (2002)
Signs (2002)
Harry Potter and the Sorcerer's Stone (2001)
Planet of the Apes (2001)
The Perfect Storm (2000)
Galaxy Quest (1999)
The Mummy (1999)
Star Wars: Episode I – The Phantom Menace (1999)
Deep Impact (1998)
The Lost World: Jurassic Park (1997)
Titanic (1997)
Star Trek: First Contact (1996)
Death Becomes Her (1992)
Hook (1991)
The Rocketeer (1991)
Star Trek VI: The Undiscovered Country (1991)
Back to the Future Part III (1990)
The Hunt for Red October (1990)
Back to the Future Part II (1989)
Ghostbusters II (1989)
Indiana Jones and the Last Crusade (1989)
Who Framed Roger Rabbit (1988)
Innerspace (1987)
Back to the Future (1985)
Cocoon (1985)
The Goonies (1985)
Young Sherlock Holmes (1985)
Starman (1984)
Star Trek III: The Search for Spock (1984)
Return of the Jedi (1983)
E.T. the Extra-Terrestrial (1982)
Star Trek II: The Wrath of Khan (1982)
Raiders of the Lost Ark (1981)
Empire Strikes Back (1980)

References

External links

Living people
Year of birth missing (living people)
Best Visual Effects Academy Award winners
Special effects people